William Johnson House may refer to:

in the United States (by state then city)
William Julius "Judy" Johnson House, Marshallton, Delaware, listed on the National Register of Historic Places (NRHP) in New Castle County
William A. and Ida C. Johnson House, Oskaloosa, Iowa, listed on the NRHP
William Johnson House (Ellicott City, Maryland)
William Johnson House (Natchez, Mississippi), listed on the NRHP in Adams County
William H. Johnson House, New Brunswick, New Jersey, NRHP-listed
William Johnson House in the Beaufort Historic District, South Carolina
William Johnson House (Fruitdale, South Dakota), NRHP-listed, in Butte County
William W. Johnson House, Franklin, Tennessee, listed on the NRHP in Williamson County
William Derby Johnson Jr. House, Kanab, Utah, listed on the NRHP in Kane County